Samuel Denton (July 2, 1803 – August 17, 1860) was an American physician and politician.

Career
Denton was born in Wallkill, New York on July 2, 1803, graduated from Castleton Medical College in Vermont in 1825, and moved to Ann Arbor, Michigan shortly afterwards. He served a three-year term on the Board of Regents of the University of Michigan beginning in 1837, and represented Washtenaw County in the Michigan State Senate from 1845 to 1848, serving as President pro tempore during the final session. He was a professor of medicine and pathology at the University of Michigan Medical School from 1850 until his death in Ann Arbor on August 17, 1860.

References

1803 births
1860 deaths
Regents of the University of Michigan
Michigan state senators
University of Michigan faculty
19th-century American politicians